Sascha Kindred,  (born 13 December 1977 in Münster, Germany) is a British swimmer who has competed in six Summer Paralympic Games, winning thirteen medals.

Early life
Born in Germany, Kindred moved to Britain at the age of 3. He began swimming for a club at the age of 11. He attended Mossley Hollins High School and Kaskenmoor secondary school for a short period of time before going into training at local swimming clubs such as Oldham.

Kindred has cerebral palsy, which affects the right side of his body. He competes in the S6 (butterfly), SM6 (medley) and SB7 (breaststroke) classifications.

Paralympic career
Sascha is one of the most successful Paralympic athletes ever, taking part in 6 Paralympic Games.

Kindred first competed at the Paralympic Games in Atlanta 1996 and won a silver medal in the 100 m breaststroke SB7.
In May 2016 it has been announced that he will be representing Great Britain once more, and for the 6th time, in the Paralympic Games in Rio later in the year.

At the 2000 games in Sydney, Kindred won two gold medals, a silver, and a bronze. He described the games as his biggest sporting achievement so far.

In the 2004 Athens Paralympics, Kindred won two gold medals, successfully defending the 100 m breaststroke SB7 and 200 m individual medley SM6 titles he had won in Sydney. He also won a bronze medal in the 4×50 m freestyle 20 pts.

Kindred won his fifth Paralympic gold in the 200 m individual medley SM6 at the 2008 Games in Beijing, where he set a new world record time of 2:49.19 and earned the title for the third consecutive year. He then won a second gold of the games, six titles overall, and set another world record of 1:22.18 in the 100 m breaststroke SB7. The third medal he won was a bronze in the 50 m butterfly S6.
He went on to his fifth Paralympic Games in London where he won a silver medal in the 200m IM in a time of 2:41.50

In addition to his success in the Paralympics, Kindred has won 19 medals (9 gold) at IPC World Championships, 24 medals (9 gold) at European Championships, and a gold medal at the 2006 Paralympic World Cup in Manchester.

Personal life

Kindred's wife is fellow British Paralympic gold medal-winning swimmer Nyree Lewis. Together the pair, who live in Herefordshire, are known as the "golden couple" of British disability swimming.

He includes amongst his sporting heroes Eric Cantona, Michael Johnson and Carl Lewis, and is a supporter of Manchester United.

Kindred was appointed Officer of the Order of the British Empire (OBE) in the 2009 New Year Honours and Commander of the Order of the British Empire (CBE) in the 2017 New Year Honours for services to swimming.

See also
 Great Britain at the 2008 Summer Paralympics
 List of Paralympic records in swimming
 Swimming at the 2008 Summer Paralympics
 Swimming at the 2004 Summer Paralympics
 Swimming at the 2000 Summer Paralympics
 Swimming at the 1996 Summer Paralympics

References

External links
 
 
 
 
 

1977 births
Living people
British male swimmers
Paralympic swimmers of Great Britain
Paralympic gold medalists for Great Britain
Paralympic silver medalists for Great Britain
Paralympic bronze medalists for Great Britain
Swimmers at the 1996 Summer Paralympics
Swimmers at the 2000 Summer Paralympics
Swimmers at the 2004 Summer Paralympics
Swimmers at the 2008 Summer Paralympics
Swimmers at the 2012 Summer Paralympics
Swimmers at the 2016 Summer Paralympics
Medalists at the 1996 Summer Paralympics
Medalists at the 2000 Summer Paralympics
Medalists at the 2004 Summer Paralympics
Medalists at the 2008 Summer Paralympics
Medalists at the 2012 Summer Paralympics
Commanders of the Order of the British Empire
World record holders in paralympic swimming
S6-classified Paralympic swimmers
Medalists at the 2016 Summer Paralympics
Team Bath swimmers
Team Bath Paralympic athletes
Medalists at the World Para Swimming Championships
Medalists at the World Para Swimming European Championships
Paralympic medalists in swimming